South Elgin High School (SEHS), opened August 24, 2005, is a four-year high school located in South Elgin, Illinois, a northwest suburb of Chicago, Illinois, in the United States. It is part of Elgin Area School District U46. The school is located on property formerly owned by the Kenyon Brothers Dairy Farms.

Student demographics

The average class size in 2017 was 21.8 students. 77.6% of students enrolled in a college or university at 12 months. 358 seniors were enrolled in advanced coursework.

Notable alumni
Jake Kumerow, NFL wide receiver
Cale Morris, ice hockey goaltender

References

External links
School website
District website

Educational institutions established in 2005
Public high schools in Illinois
South Elgin, Illinois
Schools in Kane County, Illinois
2005 establishments in Illinois
Elgin Area School District U46